Buduka Dylan Batubinsika (born 15 February 1996) is a French professional footballer who plays as a centre-back for Israeli Premier League club Maccabi Haifa, on loan from Primeira Liga club Famalicão.

Club career
Batubinska played as a youngster for Paris Saint-Germain Academy. In 2014 he began playing for the club's reserve team, capping 52 times and scoring twice.

On 13 July 2017, Batubinsika joined Antwerp from the Belgian First Division A. During his 4-year spell with the club he capped 73 times and scored 3 goals, and won the 2019–20 Belgian Cup.

On 23 July 2021, he signed a four-year contract with Portuguese top-tier Primeira Liga club Famalicão.

On 31 August 2022, Batubinsika was loaned to Israeli top-teir Ligat Ha'Al club Maccabi Haifa for the rest of the 2022–23 season, with an option to make the signing permanent. On 3 September 2022 he made his debut for the club in a 2–1 victory over Hapoel Be'er Sheva.

Personal life
Born in France, Batubinsika is of DR Congolese descent.

References

External links

1996 births
Sportspeople from Pontoise
Living people
French footballers
France youth international footballers
Association football defenders
Paris Saint-Germain F.C. players
Royal Antwerp F.C. players
F.C. Famalicão players
Maccabi Haifa F.C. players
Belgian Pro League players
Primeira Liga players
Israeli Premier League players
French expatriate footballers
Expatriate footballers in Belgium
Expatriate footballers in Portugal
Expatriate footballers in Israel
French expatriate sportspeople in Belgium
French expatriate sportspeople in Portugal
French expatriate sportspeople in Israel
French sportspeople of Democratic Republic of the Congo descent
Footballers from Val-d'Oise
Black French sportspeople